Ivan Morton Niven (October 25, 1915 May 9, 1999) was a Canadian-American mathematician, specializing in number theory and known for his work on Waring's problem. He worked for many years as a professor at the University of Oregon, and was president of the Mathematical Association of America. He was the author of several books on mathematics.

Life
Niven was born in Vancouver. He did his undergraduate studies at the University of British Columbia and was awarded his doctorate in 1938 from the University of Chicago. He was a member of the University of Oregon faculty from 1947 to his retirement in 1981. He was president of the Mathematical Association of America (MAA) from 1983 to 1984.

He died in 1999 in Eugene, Oregon.

Research
Niven gave a proof that  is irrational in 1947. Niven completed the solution of most of Waring's problem in 1944. This problem, based on a 1770 conjecture by Edward Waring, consists of finding the smallest number  such that every positive integer is the sum of at most  -th powers of positive integers.

Niven numbers, Niven's constant, and Niven's theorem are named for Niven.

He has an Erdős number of 1 because he coauthored a paper with Paul Erdős.

Recognition
Niven received the University of Oregon's Charles E. Johnson Award in 1981. He received the MAA Distinguished Service Award in 1989.

He won a Lester R. Ford Award in 1970. In 2000, the asteroid 12513 Niven, discovered in 1998, was named after him.

Books
(1956) Irrational Numbers (Carus Mathematical Monographs, Number 11)
(1960) (with Herbert S. Zuckerman) An Introduction to the Theory of Numbers, Wiley
(1961) Calculus: An Introductory Approach,  Van Nostrand
(1961) Numbers: Rational and Irrational, Random House
(1963) Diophantine Approximations, Interscience
(1965) Mathematics of Choice: How to Count Without Counting, MAA
(1981) Maxima and Minima Without Calculus , MAA

External link
Donald Albers and G. L. Alexanderson. "A conversation with Ivan Niven", College Mathematics Journal, 22, 1991, pp. 371–402.

See also

Proof that  is irrational

References

1915 births
1999 deaths
Canadian mathematicians
20th-century American mathematicians
University of Oregon faculty
Canadian emigrants to the United States
Number theorists
University of British Columbia alumni
University of Chicago alumni
Presidents of the Mathematical Association of America
Place of birth missing
Textbook writers